Ballinderry is a townland lying within the civil parish of Kilcronaghan, County Londonderry, Northern Ireland. It lies on the eastern boundary of the parish; partly bounded by the parishes of Termoneeny and Desertmartin to the north and east. It is also bounded by the townlands of Ballynahone More, Drumsamney, Dromore, Grange, and Gortamney. It was apportioned to the Vintners company.

The townland was part of Tobermore electoral ward of the former Magherafelt District Council, however in 1926 it was part of Tobermore district electoral division as part of the Maghera division of Magherafelt Rural District. It was also part of the historic barony of Loughinsholin.

History

See also
Kilcronaghan
List of townlands in Tobermore
Tobermore

References

Townlands of County Londonderry
Civil parish of Kilcronaghan